Within Deep Dark Chambers is the first album by the Swedish band Shining. It was originally released by Selbstmord Services, in 2000. At first, it was a black LP limited to 500 copies.

Track listing

Personnel
 Niklas Kvarforth - vocals, guitar, keyboard
 Andreas Classen - vocals
 Tusk - bass guitar
 Ted Wedebrand - drums

Release history

Shining (Swedish band) albums
2000 debut albums